Joseph Robitaille (November 15, 1766 – April 29, 1854)  was a miller, farmer and political figure in Lower Canada. He represented Cornwallis in the Legislative Assembly of Lower Canada from 1808 to 1830, as a supporter of the Parti canadien and later the Parti patriote.

He was born in Ancienne-Lorette, the son of Romain Robitaille and Marie-Josephte Drolet. Robitaille lived in the Saint-Louis parish of Kamouraska, later moving to Saint-Pascal. He was married twice: first to Marie-Rosalie Gagnon in 1799 and then later to Élisabeth Falardeau. He did not run for reelection to the assembly in 1830. Robitaille died at Saint-Pascal at the age of 87.

References 
 

1766 births
1854 deaths
Members of the Legislative Assembly of Lower Canada